HMS Charlotte was a mercantile schooner that Royal Navy hired or chartered in 1796 (or earlier), purchased in 1797 and commissioned in 1798. In her brief military career in the Caribbean she captured two small enemy privateers before she herself fell prey to a French privateer. The British recaptured her a little more than a year later but then broke her up in 1799 rather than recommissioning her.

Cruising
The Royal Navy armed Charlotte with eight 6-pounder guns and gave her a crew of 60 men. There are no records of any of her dimensions. She was commissioned under Lieutenant John Williams. A letter from Commander James Athol Wood of  reporting on the recapture of a vessel on 9 March 1796, states that he put "The Officers on Board the Charlotte Sloop, Lieutenant Williams...".

On 29 May 1797 Charlotte captured the French schooner Mort, off Dominica. Mort was armed with four guns and had a crew of 36 men. She had not made any captures since leaving Guadeloupe.

On 9 September Charlotte  captured the Dutch privateer Esle Andeneming, of Surinam. Esle Andeneming was armed with eight guns and had a crew of 38 men. She was provisioned for a three-month cruise and was nineteen days out, not having captured anything, when Charlotte captured her off the Demerary river.

Capture
Lieutenant John Thicknesse replaced Williams. Shortly thereafter, on 16 October 1798 the French 14-gun privateer Enfant Prodigue captured Charlotte off Cap Français or Cape François, Hispaniola. Charlotte suffered one man wounded before she struck her colours. A second, smaller schooner and two large armed launches supported Enfant Prodigue in the attack on Charlotte, which suffered considerable damage. Her main boom topping lift and all the braces had been shot away. One gun had been dismounted and two others disabled by broken breeches, leaving her with only five guns to continue the action. Surrounded by the enemy and unable to manoeuvre, Thicknesse was forced to surrender. Charlottes low casualty rate was a consequence of the French tactic of firing high to disable rigging. The subsequent court-martial honourably acquitted Thicknesse of the loss.

Recapture
The French Navy took her into service as Vengeur. However, on 24 November 1799,  recaptured her and three other armed vessels as well, off Cape Triburon as the four French vessels were becalmed while on their way from Cape François to Jacquemel. Vengeur was armed with eight brass 6-pounder guns and had a crew of 91 men.  shared in the capture.

Fate
The Royal Navy chose to break up Charlotte/Vengeur rather than recommission her.

Citations

References
 
 
 
  (1671-1870)
 

Schooners of the Royal Navy
Privateer ships of France
Age of Sail ships of France
1790s ships
Captured ships